La Grande-4/Lac de la Falaise Water Aerodrome  is an aerodrome located on Lake Katatipawasakakamaw near the La Grande-4 generating station, Quebec, Canada.

See also
La Grande-4 Airport

References

Registered aerodromes in Nord-du-Québec
Seaplane bases in Quebec